Vincent Smith may refer to:

Vince Powell (1928–2009), born Vincent Smith, television writer
Vin Smith (1913–1995), Australian footballer
Vince Smith (1938–2008), Australian politician
Vince Smith (boxer), English boxer
Vincent Smith (Chuck)
Vincent Smith (American football) (born 1990), American football player
Vince Smith (cybertaxonomist)
Vincent Smith (television presenter) (1943–1991), Australian journalist and broadcaster
Vincent Arthur Smith (1848–1920), Irish-born Indologist, historian and art historian
Vincent D. Smith (1929–2003) American artist, teacher, painter and printmaker known for his vivid and colorful depictions of Black life.
Vincent Powell-Smith (1939–1997), British barrister and author
Vincent Reynolds Smith (1890–1960), judge and politician in Saskatchewan, Canada
Vinnie Smith (1915–1979), baseball player